Guy Richer (born August 10, 1954) is a Canadian actor. Aside from a few other roles, he is notable for his portrayal of Canadian Prime Minister Jean Chrétien in the 2002 television miniseries Trudeau.

External links
 

1954 births
Living people
Canadian male film actors
Canadian male television actors
French Quebecers
Male actors from Quebec
Place of birth missing (living people)
21st-century Canadian male actors